Raz Nathan Shahi (7 August 1947 – 4 November 2019) is a Pakistani artist, calligrapher, writer and poet.

Early life
His real name is Ali Sher Merani and he was born to Noor Muhammad Merani. He was born on 7 Aug 1947 in a small town of Khairpur Nathan Shah in Dadu District, Sindh, Pakistan .

Services
He illustrated the poetry of Shah Abdul Latif Bhittai in picturesque calligraphy in Sindhi and Urdu.

Nathanshahi worked at the Pakistan Television Corporation for 35 years as writer and artist. He received several prizes, gold medals and certificates from different institutions.

References

Pakistani artists
Pakistani calligraphers
1947 births
Living people
People from Dadu District